Ricardo Ramos (born 5 December 1985) is a Mexican long-distance runner. At the 2016 Summer Olympics, he competed in the marathon, finishing in 120th place in just his third marathon.

Ramos took up long-distance running aged 19 to improve his health. He is married and has three children. He serves with the Mexican Army.

Personal Bests
5000m - 14:27.19 (2016)
10000m - 29:35.85 (2016)
Half Marathon - 1:05.00 (2016)
Marathon - 2:14.58 (2016)

References

Living people
1985 births
Mexican male long-distance runners
Mexican male marathon runners
Olympic athletes of Mexico
Athletes (track and field) at the 2016 Summer Olympics
21st-century Mexican people